Bini is a village in the Ouo Department of Comoé Province in south-western Burkina Faso. The village has a population of 283.

References

External links
Satellite map at Maplandia.com

Populated places in the Cascades Region
Comoé Province